Ecpeptamena is a genus of moths belonging to the family Tineidae. It contains only one species, Ecpeptamena esotera, which is found in Sierra Leone.

References

Tineidae
Monotypic moth genera
Moths of Africa
Tineidae genera